Dorna may refer to:

Places

Austria
 Dorna, Austria, a village in the town of Irnfritz-Messern, Horn District in Lower Austria

Germany
 Dorna (Kemberg), a village, part of the town Kemberg in Wittenberg district in Saxony-Anhalt

Romania
 Dorna, a village in Așchileu Commune, Cluj County
 Dorna-Arini, Suceava County
 Dorna Candrenilor, Suceava County
 Vatra Dornei, Suceava County
 Dorna (river), tributary of the Bistrița in Suceava County

Other
 Dorna (boat), a design of fishing boat in Galicia in northwestern Spain
 Dorna (fire control system), a naval fire control system by Navantia
 Dorna (water), a Romanian mineral water bought in 2002 by The Coca-Cola Company
 Dorna Sports, the commercial rights holders for MotoGP
 Hava Faza Dorna, an Iranian aircraft manufacturer
 HESA Dorna, a jet-powered Iranian training aircraft

See also
 Dornești, a commune located in Suceava County, Romania
 Dornişoara, a village in Suceava County, Romania